Van Hamme is a surname. Notable people with the surname include:

Alexis Van Hamme (1818–1875), Belgian painter
Jean Van Hamme (born 1939), Belgian writer
Thomas Van Hamme (born 1969), Belgian television presenter
Victor Van Hamme (1897–?), Belgian weightlifter

Surnames of Dutch origin